The New Haven Underground Film Festival is an annual film festival held in Connecticut, United States. Despite its name, the event itself has never been held in New Haven; instead, it has been held in other Connecticut cities while carrying the slogan "So underground that it's not even in New Haven."

This festival has hosted premieres and screenings of independent, underground and experimental productions from around the world, including a mix of narrative and non-fiction features and shorts. Among the more notable films presented at the festival were My Big Fat Independent Movie, Flatland and Plan 9 from Syracuse.

References

External links
Official website
Film Threat coverage of the 2008 film festival
Interview with festival co-founder Michael Mongillo

Film festivals in Connecticut
Culture of New Haven, Connecticut
Tourist attractions in New Haven, Connecticut
Underground film festivals
Experimental film festivals